Tina Hassel (born 11 May 1964) is a German broadcast journalist. Since July 2015 she has been director of the capital studio of ARD, the German public broadcasting association.

Early life and education
Born in Cologne, Hassel studied at the universities of Cologne and Bordeaux and earned a Magister degree in Germanic studies, history and political science.

Career
While still a student, Hassel began working for radio and TV stations in Germany and France.

Hassel worked at Westdeutscher Rundfunk (WDR) from 1990 to 1994, initially as a volunteer and then starting in 1992 as an editor and presenter. From 1994 to 1999, she was the Paris correspondent of WDR's parent organization ARD. In addition, in December 2001 she became foreign head at WDR. She then headed ARD's studio in Washington, DC from July 2012 to June 2015.

On 1 July 2015, Hassel succeeded Ulrich Deppendorf as director and chief television editor at the ARD capital studio in Berlin, the first woman to hold the position. In this capacity, she is also the presenter of Bericht aus Berlin (Report from Berlin). Among others, she has interviewed Prime Minister Theresa May (2018) and Chancellor Angela Merkel (2020, and 2021).

Criticism  
Hassel rejected the accusation that the tweets had been insufficiently neutral.

Personal life
Hassel is married and has three children. She is a patron of Kinderhospiz Bethel, a children's hospice in Bielefeld, and is a member of Atlantik-Brücke.

References 

Television people from Cologne
University of Cologne alumni
University of Bordeaux alumni
German radio presenters
German women radio presenters
German television journalists
German women television presenters
German television presenters
German women television journalists
German broadcast news analysts
1964 births
Living people
ARD (broadcaster) people
Westdeutscher Rundfunk people